WEPA was a radio station on 710 AM in Eupora, Mississippi, operating between 1974 and 1998.

History

WEPA signed on the air May 3, 1974, owned by Tri County Broadcasting Company, a subsidiary of Sisk Broadcasting. The first announcer on WEPA was Mackey Dozier. An FM station, WEXA 101.7 (now WLZA), was added on September 1, 1978, with the two stations sharing about 20 percent of their programming.

WEPA primarily carried a country music format as "King Country" for most of its history, with gospel music on Sundays. Harry and Carolyn Jackson were the longtime station and program managers, respectively; they hosted a tradio program known as The Party Line Program six days a week.

In 1998, new studios were built for WLZA in Starkville, and WEPA signed off the air. The former Eupora facilities burned down in 2005.

References

External links
FCC History Cards for WEPA

Radio stations established in 1974
Radio stations disestablished in 1998
EPA
Defunct radio stations in the United States
1974 establishments in Mississippi
1998 disestablishments in Mississippi
EPA
EPA